Pembamnazi, also known as Pemba Mnazi, is an administrative ward in the Kigamboni district of Dar es Salaam Region in Tanzania. In 2016 the Tanzania National Bureau of Statistics report there were 12,112 people in the ward, from 9,672 in 2012.

References

Wards of Dar es Salaam Region